The Hickman House is a historic house at 3568 Mt. Holly Road, in rural Ouachita County, Arkansas, south of Camden. The single story frame house was built in 1898, probably by George Edward Hickman, whose father John was one of the county's early settlers. The house is in Folk Victorian style; it has an L-shaped plan, sheathed in original weatherboard. Its principal ornamentation is in the chamfered posts of its porch, which also has sawn fretwork. The house faces east, and is set about  back from the road; its front facade has two windows above the porch, and two that open onto it.

The house was listed on the National Register of Historic Places in 2006.  The house has been donated by the Hickman family to the Ouachita County Historical Society.

See also
National Register of Historic Places listings in Ouachita County, Arkansas

References

External links
The Hickman House - Ouachita County Historical Society

Houses on the National Register of Historic Places in Arkansas
Victorian architecture in Arkansas
Houses completed in 1898
Houses in Ouachita County, Arkansas
National Register of Historic Places in Ouachita County, Arkansas
1898 establishments in Arkansas
Folk Victorian architecture in the United States